Idrottsföreningen Kamraterna Norrköping Damlag, more commonly known as IFK Norrköping or simply Norrköping, is a women's football club from Norrköping, in Östergötland County, Sweden. The team, a section of IFK Norrköping, was founded in 2009 and entered Division 2. They promoted to the top tier Damallsvenskan for the first time in 2022.

The club play their home games at Nya Parken in Norrköping. The club colours, reflected in their crest and kit, are white and blue. The club is affiliated to the Östergötlands Fotbollförbund.

Current squad

References

External links
 IFK Norrköping – Official website 

Women's football clubs in Sweden
2009 establishments in Sweden
Association football clubs established in 2009
Football clubs in Östergötland County
Sport in Norrköping
 
Idrottsföreningen Kamraterna